Centerpin fishing, also called float fishing or center pin fishing, is a fishing technique which uses  a centerpin rod, a centerpin reel, and Roe,  or an artificial fly. The method is used  for steelhead fishing in fresh water, and is currently popular with freshwater salmon anglers who drift floats downstream.

References
 Gross WH (2008) Steelhead & Salmon: Use the Secrets of the Pros to Catch More and Bigger Fish Lyons Press Series. 
 McClane AJ and Gardner K (1987) The Complete book of fishing: a guide to freshwater, saltwater & big-game Page 12. Gallery Books.

External links
 5 tips for beginning center pin anglers Woods N Water News, March 1, 2008.